Sarab-e Darab (also Romanized as Sarāb-e Dārāb) is a village in Beyranvand-e Jonubi Rural District, Bayravand District, Khorramabad County, Lorestan Province, Iran. At the 2006 census, its population was 200, in 46 families.

References 

Towns and villages in Khorramabad County